The 1946 Mississippi Southern Southerners football team represented Mississippi Southern College (now known as the University of Southern Mississippi) in the 1946 college football season. The team played in the Bacardi Bowl against the University of Havana.

Schedule

After the season

The 1947 NFL Draft was held on December 16, 1946. The following Southerner was selected.

References

Mississippi Southern
Southern Miss Golden Eagles football seasons
Mississippi Southern Southerners football